Koli Bodkha is a village in the Aurangabad District of Maharashtra, India. It is located 23.3 km away from Paithan, 78.5 km from Aurangabad, and 294 km from the main state city of Mumbai.

Villages in Aurangabad district, Maharashtra